AirDine was a supper club mobile app based on the sharing economy principles where individuals stand as both supplier and customer, similar to Airbnb in the short time rental market.

AirDine discontinued their service after 31 October 2017.

Operations
AirDine is an online marketplace for home dining that connects users that likes to cook (often professional chef or homecooks) with users looking for a fun dining experience. Users are categorized as "Hosts" and "Guests," both of whom must register with AirDine using a variety of means.

Profiles include details such as user reviews and shared social connections to build a reputation and trust among users of the marketplace. Other elements of the AirDine profile include user recommendations and a private messaging system.

Corporate information

Business model 
AirDine is a peer-to-peer home dining market place that connects hosts and guests via its app. AirDine enables transactions between these two entities by charging a 'service fee' without directly hosting any dinners by itself. This new business model disrupt traditional industries by creating new sources of supply and rely on curation for developing quality and self-attainment of maturity from the vendors, or the people operating on behalf of vendors. Security and safety of the host are not vetted by AirDine and are completely left to users to choose based on published reviews. Unlike traditional restaurants, AirDine scales not by scaling inventory and sales but by increasing the hosts and guests and matching them with each other.

See also
Online platforms for collaborative consumption
Filip Johansen

References

Online services
Swedish companies established in 2016
Business models
Sharing economy
Decentralization
Supper clubs
Internet properties disestablished in 2017
Internet properties established in 2016
2016 establishments in Sweden
2017 disestablishments in Sweden